Hans Karl LaRondelle (born April 18, 1929 – March 7, 2011) was a respected Seventh-day Adventist theologian; a strong proponent of the gospel and salvation by faith alone. In a 1985 questionnaire of North American Adventist Theology lecturers, LaRondelle tied for fourth place among the Adventist authors who had most influenced them, and was number one amongst the under 39 age group. He died March 7, 2011.

Biography 

In 1929, LaRondelle was born in the Netherlands into a Roman Catholic family. From the age of eight, he received education in Protestant schools.  While a law student at Leyden University, at the age of nineteen, he read a book by Voorthuis, a Dutch Adventist minister. Later, he met this man and studied the Bible with him. In 1949, he came to believe the Seventh-day Adventist message by studying the book The Great Controversy by Adventist pioneer and visionary, Ellen G. White. He served in his Netherlands homeland as a pastor, evangelist, youth leader, and teacher for fourteen years. In 1960, on the encouragement of Adventist educator, Dr. W. G. C. Murdoch, he began studies at the Free University of Amsterdam. He studied for six years under Professor G.C. Berkouwer. At the same time he carried a full ministerial work load. In 1962, he was ordained while pastoring in the Netherlands. In 1966, he went to Detroit in America as a delegate from the Netherlands Union to the General Conference session. He enjoyed the sense of freedom in the United States and decided to continue his education at Andrews University. While he was a student at Andrews, a member of the staff, Dr. E. E. Heppenstall, was teaching the subject Righteousness by Faith to a class of 116 students. Heppenstall became ill and was unable to continue teaching the course. Some students asked the administration to have LaRondelle take over the instruction. In 1969, Andrews University sponsored his return to the Netherlands for further study. He studied again under his mentor and friend Professor G. C. Berkouwer at the Reformed Free University, Vrije Universiteit in Amsterdam. Two years later, in 1971, LaRondelle had completed the Doctor of Theology degree in Systematic Theology. He  was a professor of Systematic Theology in the Theological Seminary at Andrews University, Berrien Springs, Michigan, U.S.A. from 1967 to 1991. He, along with Desmond Ford and Edward Heppenstall, was a major opponent of Robert Brinsmead's perfectionistic "Sanctuary Awakening" movement. LaRondelle was professor emeritus of theology at the Seventh-day Adventist Theological Seminary at Andrews University. He lived in Bradenton, Florida, where he died March 7, 2011, of thyroid cancer.

Theology 

Hans K. LaRondelle studied with G. C. Berkouwer

Publications 

 Perfection and Perfectionism: A Dogmatic-Ethical Study of Biblical Perfection and Phenomenal Perfectionism (Andrews University Press, 1975)
 Christ Our Salvation: What God Does For Us and in Us (Mountain View, California: Pacific Press, 1980). 96 pages.
 Deliverance in the Psalms: Messages of Hope for Today (Berrien Springs, MI: First Impressions, 1983). 210 pages.
 The Israel of God in Prophecy: Principles of Prophetic Interpretation (Andrews University Press, 1983). 226 pages.  (publisher's page ; brief sample ). Adventist Kenneth Strand reviewed it as "the best work that I have seen on this subject" (Ministry September 1983, p. 32). See also Jon Paulien's review in AUSS Autumn 1984, p. 373–76.
 Chariots of Salvation: The Biblical Drama of Armageddon (Review and Herald Publishing Association, 1987). 192 pages.
 Our Creator Redeemer: An Introduction to Biblical Covenant Theology (Andrews University Press). 208 pages.  (publisher's page ; brief sample )
 How to Understand the End-Time Prophecies of the Bible (Sarasota, Florida: First Impressions, 1997)
 Light for the Last Days: Jesus’ Endtime Prophecies Made Plain in the Book of Revelation (Pacific Press, 2000). See review by Desmond Ford

Footnotes

See also 

 Seventh-day Adventist Church
 Seventh-day Adventist theology
 Seventh-day Adventist eschatology
 History of the Seventh-day Adventist Church
 28 Fundamental Beliefs
 Questions on Doctrine
 Teachings of Ellen G. White
 Inspiration of Ellen G. White
 Prophecy in the Seventh-day Adventist Church
 Investigative judgment
 Pillars of Adventism
 Second Coming
 Conditional Immortality
 Historicism
 Three Angels' Messages
 Sabbath in seventh-day churches
 Ellen G. White
 Adventist Review
 Adventism
 Seventh-day Adventist Church Pioneers
 Seventh-day Adventist worship

References 

 Shabbat Shalom 52:2 (2005), 8–12. Interview with Hans K. Larondelle.

External links 
 Articles by LaRondelle  cataloged in the Seventh-day Adventist Periodical Index (SDAPI)
 Ministry Magazine Articles by Hans K. LaRondelle

1929 births
2011 deaths
Seventh-day Adventist theologians
American Seventh-day Adventists
American Christian theologians
History of the Seventh-day Adventist Church
Dutch Seventh-day Adventists
Vrije Universiteit Amsterdam alumni
Andrews University faculty
Dutch emigrants to the United States
Converts to Adventism
Former Roman Catholics